Tonkovich is a surname. Notable people with the surname include:

Andy Tonkovich (1922–2006), American basketball player
Dan R. Tonkovich (1946–2002), American politician

See also

Tonković

Americanized surnames
Croatian surnames